Anthi Papakonstantinou (born 13 September 1995) is a Greek footballer who plays as a goalkeeper for First Division club Aris Limassol and the Greece women's national team.

Honours
PAOK
A Division(9): 2012, 2013, 2015, 2016, 2017, 2018, 2019, 2020, 2021
Greek Cup(5): 2013, 2014, 2015, 2016, 2017

References

1995 births
Living people
Women's association football goalkeepers
Greek women's footballers
Greece women's international footballers
PAOK FC (women) players